OGPL (The Open Government Platform) is a joint product from India and the United States to promote government transparency and greater citizen engagement by making more government data, documents, tools and processes publicly available. OGPL will be available as an open source platform. The OGPL combines and expands features of the India's "India.gov.in" and the U.S. "Data.gov" sites. By making this available in useful machine-readable formats it allows developers, analysts, media & academia to develop new applications and insights that will help give citizens more information for better informed decisions.

Chair

This initiative has been chaired on the Indian side by Sam Pitroda, Adviser to Prime Minister on Public Information Infrastructure and Innovations and on the US side by Aneesh Chopra, former Chief Technology Officer to President Obama.

Purpose
The purpose of the platform is to enhance access and use of government data to foster innovation.

In using an open source method of development, the OGPL community will provide future technology enhancements, open government solutions, and community-based technical support. OGPL has become an example of a new era of diplomatic collaborations that benefit the global community that promote government transparency, citizen-focused applications, and enrich humanity.

Features of OGPL

Initially, OGPL will provide governments the ability to
 Publish government data, documents, apps, tools, and services from multiple departments within a government
 Utilize web 2.0 open-source technologies to develop low-cost, cloud-based infrastructure
 Engage citizens with open data based applications and services to improve their lives
 Create data-rich community spaces around topics of national priorities and international interest
 Empower end-users to share data via social media platforms such as Facebook, LinkedIn and Twitter
 In the future, provide publicly available application programming interfaces (APIs) and other tools to add external software modules for data visualization, wizards, and other purposes

See also

 My Gov

External links
 OGPL brochure 
 OGPL release
 OGPL's Webcast by Shri Kapil Sibal, Hon'ble Minister for Communications & IT and HRD

Open government
E-government in India
Open government in the United States
Open government in India